Managua earthquake may refer to:
1931 Nicaragua earthquake
1972 Nicaragua earthquake
2014 Nicaragua earthquake

See also
List of earthquakes in Nicaragua